Keepin' Up with the Joneses is an album by The Jones Brothers: trumpeter Thad, pianist  Hank and drummer Elvin, along with bassist Eddie Jones, recorded for the MetroJazz label in 1958.

Reception 

The Allmusic review by Ken Dryden states: "In spite of their very long careers in jazz, brothers Hank, Thad and Elvin Jones made relatively few recordings together; this Leonard Feather-produced date got the three of them into the studio and added to the gimmick by including Eddie Jones (no relation) on bass, and performing exclusively works by Thad or Isham Jones (also no relation). ... Thad's rich flugelhorn is as strong as on any date he ever recorded, while Hank's playing is a little more reserved than usual, and Elvin, known for his fierce attack, sticks mainly to brushes".

Track listing
All compositions by Thad Jones except where noted
 "Nice and Nasty" – 6:45
 "Keepin' up With the Joneses" – 6:11
 "Three and One" – 4:57
 "Sput 'N' Jeff" – 6:04
 "It Had to Be You" (Isham Jones, Gus Kahn) – 4:48
 "On the Alamo" (Isham Jones, Kahn) – 3:13
 "There Is No Greater Love" (Isham Jones, Marty Symes) – 4:04

Personnel
Thad Jones – flugelhorn, trumpet
Hank Jones – piano 
Elvin Jones – drums 
Eddie Jones - bass

References

1958 albums
Thad Jones albums
Hank Jones albums
Elvin Jones albums
MetroJazz Records albums